Ululation, is a long, wavering, high-pitched vocal sound resembling a howl with a trilling quality. It is produced by emitting a high pitched loud voice accompanied with a rapid back and forth movement of the tongue and the uvula.

Around the world

Ululation is practiced either alone or as part of certain styles of singing, on various occasions of communal ritual events (like weddings) used to express strong emotion.

Ululation is practised in all parts of Africa, the Middle East, and as far east as Central and South Asia. It is also practiced in a few places in Europe, like Cyprus, and among the diaspora community originating from these areas. Ululation also occurs among Mizrahi Jews during simcha (festive occasions) such as at the inauguration of a Torah scroll (hachnasat sefer Torah), brit milah (circumcision), communal celebrations, weddings, bar mitzvah celebrations, and most of all at henna celebrations. The Modern Hebrew word for ululation is "tsahalulim" (Hebrew: צהלולים). Recordings of various styles of ululations are commonly found in the music of artists performing Mizrahi styles of music.

Ululation is commonly used in Middle Eastern weddings. In the Arab world, zaghārīt (Arabic: زغاريت) is a ululation performed to honor someone. For example, zagharits are widely performed and documented in Egyptian movies featuring traditional Egyptian weddings, where women are known for their very long and very loud performed ululations. Another example of the incorporation of ululations into traditional wedding songs can be found in Zaghareed (also spelled zaghareet), a collection of traditional Palestinian wedding songs reinterpreted and rearranged by Mohsen Subhi and produced in 1997 by the Palestinian National Music and Dance Troupe El-Funoun.

In Ethiopia and Eritrea, ululation (called ililta) is part of a Christian religious ritual performed by worshipers as a feature of Sunday or other services in the Ethiopian Orthodox Tewahedo Church, Eritrean Orthodox Tewahedo Church, and some Ethiopian Evangelical Churches.  In Hausa ululation is called guda, in Zulu lilizela in Tsonga nkulungwani and in Northern SiNdebele ukubulula. Ululation is incorporated into African musical styles such as Tshangani music, where it is a form of audience participation, along with clapping and call-and-response.

In Tanzania ululation is a celebratory cheer sound when good news has been shared or during weddings, welcoming of a newborn home, graduations and other festivals even in church when sermons are going on. In Swahili it is known as vigelele and in Luo dialect it is known as udhalili. Generally women exuberantly yell lililili in a high-pitched voices. Female children are usually proud of being able to ululate like their mothers and aunts.

Ululation is also widely practiced in the eastern parts of India, where it is also known as Ululudhvani. People, especially women roll their tongues and produce this sound during all Hindu temple rituals, festivals and celebrations. This is also an integral part of most weddings in these parts where, depending upon the local usages, women ululate to welcome the groom or bride or both. Bengalis call it ulu-uli and they use this during weddings and other festivals. Odias call it Hulahuli or Huluhuli.
 In Odisha, ululation is used to cheer during weddings, cultural gatherings and celebrations. Assamese call it uruli. In Tamil, it is known as kulavai (Tamil:குளவை). In Kerala, ululation is essential for all ceremonial occasions and the term used in Malayalam is kurava.

Ululation is used to some extent by south European women The Basque  is a signal of happiness originating from shepherds.
It has been proposed as a technique for vocal rehabilitation.
The Galician  is performed with accompanied vocalization from the throat.

Ululation is rooted in the culture of North Africa, Northern parts of West Africa and Eastern Africa as well as Southern Africa and is widely practiced in Tanzania, Kenya, Angola, Democratic Republic of the Congo, Botswana, Lesotho, Malawi, Mozambique, Namibia, South Africa, Eswatini, Ethiopia-Eritrea, Somalia, Uganda, Zambia, and Zimbabwe. It is used by women to give praises at weddings and all other celebrations. It is a general sound of good cheer and celebration, when good news has been delivered in a place of gathering, even in church. It is also an integral part of most African weddings where women gather around the bride and groom, dancing and ululating exuberantly. During graduation ceremonies ululation shows pride and joy in scholastic achievement. The women ululating usually stand and make their way to the front to dance and ululate around the graduate.

Among the Lakota, women yell lililili! in a high-pitched voice to praise warriors for acts of valor.

In ancient times
In Ancient Egypt, reference to ululation appears on the inscription of the pyramid texts of Unas, on the West Wall of the Corridor (section XIII), and of Pepi I, in the Spells for Entering the Akhet. However, in Aeschylus' Agamemnon, along with being an expression of joy, it is also used for fury, and in Sophocles' Electra it is employed as an expression of grief. As in many cultures, use depended on context, as ululated exclamations could appear in different circumstances as a cry of lament or as a battle-cry.

Homer mentions ololuge (ululation) in his works, as does Herodotus, citing ululation in North Africa – where it is still practiced – saying: I think for my part that the loud cries uttered in our sacred rites came also from thence; for the Libyan women are greatly given to such cries and utter them very sweetly.

Or in another translation: I also think that the ololuge or cry of praise emitted during the worship of Athena started in Libya, because it is often employed by Libyan women, who do it extremely well.For the ancient Greeks, Libya denoted a much larger expanse than present-day Libya.

The Hebrew word Hallelujah, translated as a call to "praise the Lord", contains the root H-L-L, with meanings related to "praise". This root may have originally been an onomatopoeic imitation of ululation performed in Israelite rituals.

See also

Keening
Onomatopoeia
Tarzan yell

References

External links

 

Singing techniques
Extended techniques